Patrick Mekari (born August 13, 1997) is an American football offensive tackle for the Baltimore Ravens of the National Football League (NFL). He played college football at California.

Professional career

Baltimore Ravens
The Baltimore Ravens signed Mekari as an undrafted free agent, as he was not selected in the 2019 NFL Draft. After a strong camp and preseason while showing off his versatility, Mekari made the Ravens initial 53-man roster, extending the streak of undrafted players making the Ravens roster to 16 years.

After coming in to the game against the Los Angeles Rams in Week 12 in the 2019 season for an injured Matt Skura, Mekari made his first start at home against the San Francisco 49ers when Matt Skura was placed on season-ending injured reserve.

During the 2020 season, Mekari was placed on the reserve/COVID-19 list by the team on November 25, 2020, and activated on December 4, 2020.

The 2021 season saw Mekari become the Ravens' starting right tackle after injuries to starting left tackle Ronnie Stanley and starting left guard/backup right tackle Tyre Phillips in Week 1.  Starting right tackle Alejandro Villanueva shifted to left tackle in place of Stanley, which opened the door for Mekari to be the starting right tackle the majority of the rest of the season.

On December 30, 2021, Mekari signed a three-year contract extension with the Ravens.

NFL career statistics

Personal life
He is the son of an Armenian/Lebanese father and Armenian/Iranian mother who settled in California.

References

External links
Baltimore Ravens bio
California Golden Bears bio

1997 births
Living people
People from Westlake Village, California
Players of American football from California
American people of Lebanese descent
American people of Iranian descent
Sportspeople of Iranian descent
Sportspeople from Los Angeles County, California
Sportspeople from Ventura County, California
American football offensive linemen
California Golden Bears football players
Baltimore Ravens players
Sportspeople of Lebanese descent